Paolo Ziliani (born 10 June 1971) is a retired Italian football defender.

References

1971 births
Living people
Italian footballers
Serie A players
Serie B players
Brescia Calcio players
A.C. Carpi players
S.S.C. Napoli players
Cosenza Calcio players
A.C. Reggiana 1919 players
Reggina 1914 players
Treviso F.B.C. 1993 players
F.C. Crotone players
S.S. Arezzo players
S.S. Chieti Calcio players
Association football defenders